The 1973 NAIA Soccer Championship was the 15th annual tournament held by the NAIA to determine the national champion of men's college soccer among its members in the United States.

Quincy (IL) defeated Rockhurst in the final, 3–0, to claim the Hawks' fourth NAIA national title.

The final was  played in Florissant, Missouri.

Qualification

For the fourth year, the tournament field remained fixed at eight teams. Unlike the previous three years, however, additional fifth- and seventh-place finals were not contested.

Bracket

See also  
 1973 NCAA Division I Soccer Tournament
 1973 NCAA Division II Soccer Championship

References 

NAIA championships
NAIA
1973 in sports in Missouri